Turbo, also known as RacerMan, is a fictional character in the Gobots toyline, and the subsequent Challenge of the Gobots cartoon. The character transformed into a supercar. Turbo was among the main trio of heroes of the cartoon series, and appeared in every episode alongside Leader-1 and Scooter. He also appeared in the Gobots film and made a cameo in a Transformers story after the Gobots characters were purchased by Hasbro. He was voiced by Arthur Burghardt.

Gobots
Turbo was Leader-1's right hand Gobot, and one of the toughest Guardians. His car mode is shown to be one of the fastest of the Gobots, and he is both strong and powerful. Turbo is also one of the bravest Guardians, though he is sometimes rather stupid and headstrong, occasionally ending up badly injured on account of his heroics. He is one of Leader-1's most loyal troops, has a friendly "brawn versus brains" rivalry with comrade Scooter. He also has an ongoing rivalry with the Renegade Crasher – as a fellow sports car, she is usually his target of choice in battles. Like most Gobots, he could fly in robot mode, and fire energy bolts from his fists.

Turbo's voice was provided by Arthur Burghardt, who also provided the voice of the evil Devastator on the competing The Transformers television series.

Animated series
Turbo appears in every episode of the series Challenge of the Gobots, usually as a featured character.

After arriving on Earth in the pilot series, he becomes fast friends with Unicom astronaut A.J. Foster, who often drives him in car mode.

Cy-Kill, Cop-Tur, Crasher, Geeper-Creeper, Pincher, and Snoop attack a lab, but it is defended by Leader-1, Baron Von Joy, Blaster, Dozer, Dumper, Road Ranger, Scooter, Scratch and Turbo. Although the Guardians were winning the battle, an accidental backfire from Baron Von Joy's weapon allows the Renegades to escape.

Turbo appeared in "Ultra Zod" episode #14, where he dons a Power Suit and helps form the Power Warrior Courageous, which defeats Ultra Zod.

Cy-Kill, Cop-Tur, Crasher and Snoop attack Leader-1, Turbo, Scooter and Small Foot. Crasher wounds Small Foot. After attaining recordings of the Guardians the Renegades retreat. Using the recordings Cy-Kill has Herr Fiend program robot duplicates of the Guardians. When demonstrating Space Bender weapon to Unicom Leader-1 learns that the Renegades are attacking Washington. The Renegades ambush Leader-1 and replace him with his duplicate. Leading the Command Center back to Gobotron and getting rid of Scooter and Small Foot the Renegades then release duplicates of Path Finder, Rest-Q, Van Guard and Turbo. Small Foot and Scooter are able to capture the Turbo duplicate and learn where their friends were being held. Cy-Kill then replaces Good Night. Using the duplicate Turbo the Guardians infiltrated the Renegade base, free the captured Guardians and escape from Spoons and Fitor. Although blocked by the Renegades, Scooter uses a hologram of Zod to make the Renegades flee. Making it back to Gobotron the Guardians are attacked by the Guardian duplicates. The real Guardians are able to defeat their duplicates with the aid of the real Zeemon, Hans-Cuff and Rest-Q. Cy-Kill then arrives in Thrustor with more duplicates, but Small Foot is able to stop with robots using the Space Bender, which fuses their robot brains.

In episode #27, "Tarnished Image" Doctor Go creates a device that allows the Renegades to appear like Guardians. Cy-Kill, Crasher and Cop-Tur disguise themselves as Leader-1, Scooter and Turbo and go on a rampage on Earth while the real Guardians are sent on a fake rescue mission. When the Guardians return they are banished from Earth by the humans. The Guardians are eventually able to prove the Renegades staged the attacks, chase them off and capture Doctor Go.

Turbo appears in "Auto Madic" episode #28, where he dons a Power Suit and helped form the Power Warrior Courageous, which defeats Puzzler.

In "The Fall of Gobotron" episode #43 after Cy-Kill takes over Gobotron, Geeper-Creeper and Slicks are assigned to guard the modifier. They are lured away by Scooter and lead into a Guardian ambush by Turbo, Small Foot and Sparky.

Turbo appears in "Return of Gobotron" episode #45. He is given one of the Power Suits by the Last Engineer, which features enhanced blasters. He combines with the other suits and the Last Engineer's ship to form the Power Warrior Courageous and defeat a fleet of Renegade Thrustors.

Scooter and Small Foot join Nick and A.J. to watch a car stunt show which is attacked by Crasher, BuggyMan and Fly Trap. Small Foot fights Buggyman and defeats him, but the Renegades regain the upper hand until the Guardians are rescued by Leader-1 and Turbo who arrive in Power Suits. Cy-Kill vows to gain Power Suits for the Renegades. Scooter decides he needs more firepower, so he has Baron Von Joy remove his damaged holo projector in favor of a blaster unit. Screw Head, Bad Boy and Cop-Tur are sent to attack Unicom bases and distract the Guardians while Cy-Kill, Crasher and Scorp attempted to take the suits from the Guardian Command Center. Small Foot and Scooter are able to delay the Renegades until Leader-1 and Turbo return to chase away the Renegades. Realizing he is a better Guardian with his holo projector, Scooter has it reinstalled.

Turbo was among the Guardian Gobot forces who aided the Rock Lord Boulder on the planet Cordax.

Comics
Turbo appeared in the story "Scooter's Mighty Magnet."

Turbo appeared in the story "La Busqueda" (The Search) from the Argentina Gobots comic #4.

Turbo appeared in the story "El Asedio De Cy-Kill" (The Siege Of Cy-Kill) from the Argentina Gobots comic #8.

Books
Turbo appeared in the 1985 Robo Machine book The Wagner Sirens.

Robo Machines
In the Eagle comic, Turbo arrived without introduction in the second story arc – having presumably been one of the volunteers recruited from Robotron by Ex-El. He soon showed himself to be a brave and loyal addition to the Security Forces, and not as slow-witted as his cartoon equivalent. He fought with the other SF robots against Casmodon in London, and bravely rescued his comrade Dozer when under heavy fire.

Fun Publications
Turbo made a brief appearance in the story Withered Hope by Fun Publications, attending the meeting about of humans and Gobots concerned with the Cataclysm. After witnessing the strange robots from the 22nd level he asked what they were called, only to learn they were Autobots and Decepticons.

Other media
Turbo has appeared in the animated comedy series Robot Chicken in the episode "Book of Corrine".

Toy

 Gobots Turbo (1983)
Turbo’s toy was a re-release of the Machine Robo Supercar Robo figure. It was first issued in 1983, and remained available throughout the production of the Gobots toy line. It was also released in Europe.

References

External links
 Cobra Island Toys - Mighty Gobots Archive
 Challenge of the Gobots episode guide on counter-x.net
 Gobots Reviews on counter-x.net
 Turbo - Guardian on tfu.info
 STA: Gobots: MR-07 "Turbo" on toyarchive.com

1986 comics debuts
Fictional cars
Fictional cyborgs
Fictional shapeshifters
Gobots